Located in Abingdon, Washington County, Virginia, Mont Calm — also known as Montcalm — is a historic house. It is a two-story, five-bay brick farmhouse constructed in the Federal style that dates back to 1827. Its two-story extension, which was added in approximately 1905, is 40 feet long and 30 feet broad. A standing seam metal gable roof covers the home, which has a limestone base. A porch with a shed roof and Tuscan order columns supports the front facade. Virginia Governor David Campbell lived there (1779–1859).

It was listed on the National Register of Historic Places in 1974.

References

Houses on the National Register of Historic Places in Virginia
Federal architecture in Virginia
Houses completed in 1827
Houses in Washington County, Virginia
National Register of Historic Places in Washington County, Virginia
1827 establishments in Virginia